The Kurdish Academy is an institution mandated by the Kurdistan Regional Government, dealing with all issues related to Kurdish language within Iraq.

Gallery

External links  
 Kurdish Academy
Language regulators
Kurdish language
Kurdish culture
Kurdish scholars
Languages of Iraq

See also 
 Kurdish Academy of Language